The complete Chapter and Colony Roll of Phi Sigma Kappa follows this gallery of historic and newer images. Hover over photos for chapter names and captions. Many of the buildings in the historical photos are still owned by Phi Sig fraternity chapters and their alumni today, having been remodeled and expanded, while others have been replaced:

Historical Chapterhouse Images

More Recent Chapterhouse Images

List of Chapters

 

{{FratChapter2
|Chapter=Epsilon LambdaSee also Chi Pentaton
|Chartered=1934
|School=Eastern Michigan University
|State=Michigan
|Status=Active
|Range=1934-Present 
|Reference=<ref>Originated as a local, first named Chi Delta which formed in 1914 and then as Mu Sigma Chi, before joining Phi Sigma Epsilon. 'Epsilon Lambda chapter address in 2014: 128 North Normal, Ypsilanti, MI 48197. This chapter's combined alumni club is organized as: Epsilon Lambda Alumni Chapter, in honor of the older of the two groups that led to its formation. See HQ for contact info.</ref>
}}

List of Provisional Chapters of Phi Sigma Kappa
Interest groups form Provisional Chapters, which in turn become Chapters by earning a Phi Sigma Kappa Charter from the International Headquarters.  A charter is a document which conveys from a governing body permission for a local group to operate as a chapter. A PSK Charter also signifies the date and location of the new chapter, and lists its founding members. In the event of a re-colonization, a new group may still refer to the original charter date when citing the age of their chapter, even in a re-colonization.

Expansion Program

Phi Sigma Kappa supports a vigorous expansion program of two to four new chapters a year. Phi Sigma Kappa's expansion efforts typically follow one of three methods: 
 At the request of a viable interest group that contacts Phi Sigma Kappa
 By affiliation of an existing local fraternity into Phi Sigma Kappa
 As the result of planned expansion efforts by Headquarters staff.

The Fraternity takes special interest in re-chartering chapters at schools where it previously had a chapter. In such cases, significant funds may be available to support housing or scholarships that have been held in trust, awaiting re-colonization, by alumni of the original chapter.

Interested non-members can start an Interest Group at their school by contacting the Fraternity's HQ directly, or by joining a nearby active Phi Sig chapter. Unlike many national fraternities, Phi Sig allows a limited number of members from local, accredited schools in the area for this purpose.

The Fraternity maintains several full-time staff members dedicated to expansion and the support of interest groups, provisional chapters and new chapters.

Naming Rules & Provisional Chapter ListInterest groups are named temporarily after the school. Where the Fraternity has previously had a presence, re-established groups may refer to themselves by their original chapter name, with the word "Provisional Chapter" appended. Provisional Chapters at schools where Phi Sig has not had a presence will be awarded a chapter name as their induction ceremony is scheduled.

Where there is lack of progress or low membership, unsuccessful provisional chapters may be disbanded before receiving a charter or series name.

The 1985 merger resulted in the following naming compromises:
In cases where an original Phi Sigma Kappa chapter as well as a Phi Sigma Epsilon chapter were present on campus but where both are now dormant, the designation of any new group would normally be the name of the older original chapter, with allowances based on alumni preference. See also the main section on Naming System.
Phi Sigma Epsilon's practice was to name interest groups and colonies immediately. Because some colonies earned their charter within months, and others took up to four years, this resulted in a chapter roster that wasn't strictly alphabetical when listed by date of founding. The roster today, and this page, is maintained by chartering date, following Phi Sigma Kappa's practice. Buttons on the header field allow readers to sort by state, school, status, etc.
Occasionally, a PSE colony was allowed a name that referenced a former local fraternity's original name: Shepherd College's Sigma Chi chapter of Phi Sigma Kappa, for example, which honors their former local name of Theta Sigma Chi.
Several Sigma-series names were never assigned, and there are no plans to use them.

Colonies, listed below, are grouped first by those soon chartering, then by colonies, and finally by interest groups and planned expansion targets''. Groups that have an active presence on campus are bolded.

See also
Phi Sigma Kappa
ΦΣΚ's building acquisition entity: "PSK Properties"
Phi Sigma Epsilon, (includes more info on the many chapters that came from the merger)
Phi Sigma Phi, the spin-off group of a few PSE chapters from 1987 that rejected the merger.
The Student Life and Culture Archives at UIUC for a list of US institutions and the chapters formed on each campus.

Notes
 a.  For a brief period, Alpha chapter called itself "Pi" because this was the initial letter of the Greek word for "first." The Pi designation was used from 1878 coinciding with the first appearance of the public name of the Fraternity (that is, Phi Sigma Kappa) until the end of 1887.  Similarly, Beta chapter at first had selected its name to be "Alden March chapter", after the name of the founder of that college. It was only when the petition came in from the group that would become Phi Sig's Gamma chapter at Cornell that the first two chapters adopted the names Alpha and Beta.
 b.  The oldest traditional fraternities (~junior societies) at Yale named their buildings with "Hall" nicknames, by which they wished to be known on campus:  Thus Phi Sigma Kappa's Epsilon chapter adopted the name Sachem Hall. Similarly, the Theta Xi chapter was Franklin Hall, Delta Psi adopted the name St. Anthony Hall which spread to their entire small but old national fraternity, Chi Delta Theta (local literary honorary) established the Manuscript Society, Sigma Delta Chi (local) was renamed the Cloister Club which soon became Book and Snake. Phi Gamma Delta was Vernon Hall which later became Myth and Sword, Chi Phi was York Hall, Psi Upsilon became the Fence Club, and finally, Delta Phi was known at Yale as St. Elmo's. 's Sachem Hall was located at 124 Prospect Street.Tombs and Taps: An inside look at Yale's Fraternities, Sororities and Societies, accessed 14 April 2014
 c.  The Tau chapter of Phi Sigma Kappa separated from the national organization in 1956 over the issue of racial discrimination and became Phi Tau coeducational local fraternity. Two months later, the short-lived policies that incited the separation were themselves dropped, and Phi Sigma Kappa became one of the first fraternities to welcome black students.
 d.  Cornell was the only school with active chapters of both Phi Sigma Kappa and Phi Sigma Epsilon when the two fraternities merged in 1985.  Phi Sigma Epsilon's Phi Tau chapter was therefore released to join another national fraternity. It opted to join Theta Chi, but that chapter has since closed. As Theta Chi's alumni held another, larger building the chapter's former building was sold to Alpha Chi Omega sorority. More detail on this may be found in the references.
 e.  Zeta chapter's alumni are still active, and have established a significant pool of scholarship dollars administered by ΦΣΚ's national headquarters.  The funds are available to any Phi Sig or their children who attend any of the four City College of NY schools for undergraduate or graduate work.
 f.  The Sigma Zeta chapter of Phi Sigma Epsilon did not participate in the merger with Phi Sigma Kappa.  It eventually became a chapter of Phi Sigma Phi but, dissatisfied, was then re-established as a colony of Phi Sigma Kappa in 1996.
 g.  The Epsilon Septaton chapter of Phi Sigma Kappa reverted to its previous local affiliation of Delta Beta Chi in 1995.  Kappa Septaton chapter likewise ended its affiliation with Phi Sigma Kappa in 2007 to become to the Beta chapter of Delta Beta Chi. Both local chapters are now dormant. This two-chapter group is not to be confused with the small national sorority of the same name.
 h.  1952's "Bedford Resolution" was one of the reasons that led to the expulsion of Mu Triton at Boston University, which lost its charter in 1954. Similarly, Beta Triton at Knox seceded back to local status in 1955. Hartwick College's Nu Triton was closed for the same reason, also in 1955. All three are today dormant.
 i.  There exists some confusion regarding two chapters named Phi Tau. Phi Sigma Epsilon's Phi Tau chapter at Cornell was existent from 1963 until the merger with Phi Sigma Kappa in 1985 when it was released to join another national. The Fraternity retained its much older, original Gamma chapter. The former PSE chapter there should NOT be confused with Phi Sigma Kappa's Tau chapter at Dartmouth, which, upon seceding from the national fraternity in 1956, renamed itself Phi Tau. Name similarity is purely coincidental.
 j.  Both Phi Sigma Kappa and Phi Sigma Epsilon had chapters at Ferris State University.  The Phi Sigma Kappa chapter closed in 1978.  Phi Sigma Epsilon's Sigma Epsilon chapter became the Sigma Epsilon chapter of Phi Sigma Kappa when the two fraternities merged.
 k.  Greek systems have died out on some campuses. At times when the United States or Canada has entered a wartime posture or a period of significant manpower draft, such as World War I or World War II, weaker chapters of many fraternities have had to close, with some unable to recover after the war.  Campus acceptance can vary, making re-establishment far more difficult: Fraternities and sororities remain unwelcome at Queen's University, of Kingston, Ontario where PSK's Rho Chapter failed when all members of the young chapter died in service during World War I or failed to return after the war. In response to efforts by other fraternities to form or re-form on the campus in the 1920s, that University's student senate (AMS) banned Greek societies in 1933. Likewise at St. John's College, in Annapolis, Maryland, PSK's weak Sigma Chapter failed to reopen after World War II at this classics-focused liberal arts school. Neither school has fraternities or sororities today.
 l.  Beginning in the late 1960s, several small eastern schools banned their fraternity systems out of egalitarian concerns, leading to alarm among fraternity executives that such a trend would be more widespread. However, their worst fears did not come to pass, and the trend fizzled. Indeed, some of these schools, reporting a marked drop in alumni giving, have rescinded such bans. For example, former long-time Phi Sig campuses Swarthmore College and Franklin and Marshall now allow Greek organizations to re-charter. Nevertheless, PSK's Chi Chapter at Williams College, of Williamstown, Massachusetts fell to the anti-Greek trend in 1966, and remains closed to recognized expansion today. Other institutions that have adopted an anti-Greek posture include Colby College which banned them outright and Amherst College, a private college in that same Massachusetts town where PSK was founded, on which campus fraternities nevertheless exist sub-rosa. Neither Colby or Amherst Colleges have ever hosted a Phi Sig chapter.
 m.  Sigma Phi Sigma was a fraternity of 18 chapters that was unable to re-kindle itself after World War II. Several of its largest groups affiliated into Phi Sigma Kappa, merging assets for the benefit of the combined organization after SPS's dissolution in 1947. These include an exceptionally sound chapter at Cal Berkeley, which merged into PSK's Omega chapter, and most of the ex-Nevada and Wisconsin chapter members who also sought PSK.  In fact, alumni of the dormant Wisconsin chapters of both SPS and PSK merged their assets and worked together to re-establish Zeta Deuteron on the Wisconsin campus, where it had been defunct since 1931. The fine relationship PSK enjoyed with SPS at its dissolution was spurred by "notably excellent relations with PSK's Bro. Dean Palm and Bro. Bill Wood."
 n.  The Epsilon Kappa chapter of Phi Sigma Kappa separated from the national organization in 1998 and became a local organization called Phi Sigma Chi fraternity. This is not to be confused with the NY-based multicultural fraternity of Phi Sigma Chi, with which the Stevens Point chapter has no connection. This now-local chapter has disbanded.
 o.  These four functioning chapters did not participate in the merger between Phi Sigma Kappa and Phi Sigma Epsilon.  A total of seven (these four, plus a schismatic group of PSE Lambda chapter alumni who didn't transition into the new Epsilon Lambda, plus two revived chapters) would go on to form Phi Sigma Phi fraternity in 1988. See further discussion on the Talk page.
 p.  In its biggest loss to the co-ed movement which affected some fraternities on a few campuses in the 1970s, Phi Sigma Kappa's Nu Deuteron chapter at Stanford University voted to admit women in 1973, and thus voluntarily removed itself from the national fraternity by 'going local'. This action came just prior to the reintroduction of sororities on campus due to Title IX. Continuing to this day, its former building was retained by the group, still labeled as the "Phi Sig" house, and is one of many cooperative housing entities on campus. Its co-ed residents are called "Phi Sigs."  This group has no connection with the national fraternity at this time. Still, Phi Sigma Kappa has expressed a long-term goal of re-establishing itself on legacy campuses it has lost, such as Stanford.
 q.  Phi Sigma Kappa's merger with Phi Sigma Epsilon meant occasional merger of alumni groups on campuses where both fraternities had, or previously had had a presence. At the 1985 merger, both may have been inactive, or one may have been active with the other dormant, or since that time a chapter may have been re-colonized, usually taking on the older chapter's name from that campus. In the single case where both fraternities had an active chapter at the time of the merger, at Cornell, the younger chapter was released. For purposes of this list, when a chapter name is bolded this indicates it is an active chapter.
 r.  The University of Wisconsin–Platteville chapter began as the Philadelphian Society in 1866, the year this school was founded. Sometime after 1893 they adopted the name Phi Sigma, continuing as a local fraternity. The group merged into Phi Sigma Epsilon in 1969, then followed that fraternity's merger with Phi Sigma Kappa in 1985. It withdrew or closed in 1991, possibly becoming dormant for a time. However, the group, now unaffiliated with Phi Sigma Kappa, has emerged with local alumni support as a local under its old name, Phi Sigma. Website accessed 16 Feb 2020. Name similarity to PSK's Phi Sigma chapter, at Hillsdale College is merely coincidental.
 s.
 t.'''  In , Pennsylvania higher education officials announced that Mansfield would merge with Bloomsburg University and Lock Haven University in response to financial difficulties and declining enrollment, a consolidation of administrative and other functions, where each institution would represent a campus of a single university. In , the new institution was created to oversee the three universities and was named the Commonwealth University of Pennsylvania.

References

External links
Phi Sigma Kappa National Directory
Phi Sigma Kappa's Properties group, supporting chapter housing projects
Google map listing chapters

chapters
Lists of chapters of United States student societies by society